The City of Bundaberg was a local government area located in the Wide Bay–Burnett region of Queensland, Australia, encompassing the centre and inner suburbs of the regional city of Bundaberg.

History 

Local government in the Bundaberg area began on 11 November 1879 with the creation of the Bundaberg Division as one of 74 divisions around Queensland under the Divisional Boards Act 1879 with a population of 776. 

On 22 April 1881, a  area with a population of 1,192 was split from the Division and incorporated as the Borough of Bundaberg under the Local Government Act 1878.

In 1902, the municipality constructed waterworks and water supply facilities at a cost of £22,492. The reservoir capacity was 6850 ft and the pumping power being 960,000 gallons per 24 hours.

With the passage of the Local Authorities Act 1902, Barolin Division became the Shire of Barolin and the Borough of Bundaberg became the Town of Bundaberg on 31 March 1903. On 22 November 1913, Bundaberg was proclaimed a City.

In 1909, the borough was area of 1¾ square miles, with 30 miles of streets, 1400 rate-payers, a capital value of £157,085, and collected £4597 in rates (in 1908). The indebitness of the town on account of Government loans totals £39,717 13s, the annual repayment being £2532.

On 21 December 1917, the Shire of Barolin was abolished and its area split between the City of Bundaberg and the Shire of Woongarra.

On 21 November 1991, the Electoral and Administrative Review Commission, created two years earlier, produced its second report, and recommended that local government boundaries in the Bundaberg area be rationalised. The Local Government (Bundaberg and Burnett) Regulation 1993 was gazetted on 17 December 1993, and on 30 March 1994, a portion of the Woongarra (the rest of which was merged into the new Shire of Burnett) was transferred to the City, more than doubling its area and increasing its population by 8,200 in 1991 census terms.

On 15 March 2008, under the Local Government (Reform Implementation) Act 2007 passed by the Parliament of Queensland on 10 August 2007, the City of Bundaberg merged with the Shires of Burnett, Isis and Kolan to form the Bundaberg Region.

Suburbs 
The City of Bundaberg included the following settlements:

 Ashfield
 Avenell Heights
 Avoca
 Bargara1
 Branyan
 Bundaberg Central
 Bundaberg East
 Bundaberg North
 Bundaberg South
 Bundaberg West
 Coral Cove1
 Elliott Heads1
 Innes Park1

 Kensington
 Kalkie1
 Kepnock
 Millbank
 Mon Repos1
 Norville
 Qunaba1
 Rubyanna1
 Svensson Heights
 Thabeban
 Walkervale
 Windermere1

1 - split with the former Shire of Burnett

Population

* The population of the 1996 area in 1991 was 41,219.

Mayors

References

City of Bundaberg
Former local government areas of Queensland
1860 establishments in Australia
2008 disestablishments in Australia
Populated places disestablished in 2008